Skykomish Masonic Hall in Skykomish, Washington was built in 1924.  It is a King County landmark.

References

Buildings and structures in King County, Washington
Masonic buildings in Washington (state)
Masonic buildings completed in 1924